Relevance Language is a patented language created by BigFix, Inc. (later acquired by IBM) for use in their BigFix product. BigFix is software that is used to monitor the computers within an enterprise and take any necessary actions to bring the computer into compliance with defined policies. A prominent use is to determine if a particular computer (whether it's a desktop or laptop running Windows, Mac, or Linux, or a mobile device running iOS or Android) needs an update or patch and deliver the fixlet (a BigFix term for a set of instructions on how to get the update and where to install it) to the device in a bandwidth efficient manner. During the design of the software, the company was looking for any language that could directly retrieve the properties of a computer (such as CPU, disk space, etc.) but were unable to find one that was appropriate to the task. So they developed their own language to meet this need. Currently, BigFix is the only software that uses this language.

References

External links
 Introducing the Relevance language
 Relevance Inspector Reference
 BigFix/IEM Wiki Docs
 http://support.bigfix.com/
 Relevance Language guide created by IBM

Domain-specific programming languages
IBM software